Zambaali Bulasio Mukasa  is a Ugandan news anchor and media personality.  He anchors Luganda news Amasengejje  and hosts  Barometer (Akasameeme) a Luganda talk show on NBS Television (Uganda).

Background and education
Zambaali was born to the late John Wilson Segawole and Florence Sarah Nakalembe Namusisi. He grew up with his grandmother Asinansi Nasimbwa in Mugomola, Semuto.   He  sat PLE from  Kijaguzo Primary School. In  2002, he  completed his O level from St. Denis Sebugwawo Kijaguzo Secondary School   and finished his A level at Kazo Hill College School Kampala in 2004. 
He studied a Bachelor of Arts in Tourism degree from Makerere University  but he didn't complete it (2005–2007).  He graduated in 2011 with a Diploma in Journalism and Mass Communication from  UMCAT School of Journalism and Mass Communication. He also holds a Bachelor of Public Relations from Ndejje University.

Career
He began his journalism career at Tiger FM as a news anchor and presenter (2007–2008). Since then he was in service as a news anchor  and presenter on various radio stations such as Metro FM 90.8 (2008–2011), Beat FM and Capital FM (2011–2012) as a news anchor and news reporter.
In August 2012, he  joined CBS FM radio Buganda 88.8 and CBS FM Emmanduso 89.2 as a presenter, talk show host and as a news anchor for programs like Ag`okumpi Newala, Tumutendereze, Ebifa Munsi nobwengula (2012-2020). Between 2016 and July 2019, Zambaali worked as a news anchor and political show moderator at BBS Terefayina.
Zambaali joined NBS Television (Uganda) in August 2019 as a news anchor for Amasengejje (a Luganda news bulletin). and talk show host Barometer Akaasameeme a Luganda talk show programme which airs every Tuesday at 2200hrs EAST on NBS Television (Uganda).

Other considerations
Between 2005 and 2010, Zambaali served as a peer educator for Kiyita Alliance for Development, Nabweru Orphan Support Project, Makerere Women Development Association and as Chaiperson of Nabweru Youth Health Club, as a Secretary for Nansana Youth Parish.  
Since 2020, Zambaali serves as the President Church of Uganda Media Association.  He is the Director of Zabama Investment Limited (a wedding planning company).

Personal life
He is married and has three children. In 2018 and 2019, he was awarded the Dan Kyazze award of  best Luganda radio news anchor.

References

External links

Living people
Ugandan radio personalities
Ugandan television personalities
Ugandan radio presenters
Ugandan journalists
Makerere University alumni
People from Kampala District
People from Central Region, Uganda
1986 births